Rozi bin Mamat is a Malaysian politician and served as Terengganu State Executive Councillor.

Election Results

Honours
  :
  Companion of the Order of Sultan Mizan Zainal Abidin of Terengganu (SMZ)
  Knight Commander of the Order of the Crown of Terengganu (DPMT) – Dato'

References

Living people
People from Terengganu
Malaysian people of Malay descent
Malaysian Muslims
United Malays National Organisation politicians
Members of the Terengganu State Legislative Assembly
Terengganu state executive councillors
21st-century Malaysian politicians
Year of birth missing (living people)